The University of Toronto Mississauga Library, part of the  University of Toronto Libraries system, is the campus library of the University of Toronto Mississauga.

The library is located within the Hazel McCallion Academic Learning Centre, named to honor City of Mississauga mayor Hazel McCallion. The facility houses the library, the Robert Gillespie Academic Skills Centre, a Library Café, a digital environment, a classroom, an adaptive technology centre, a finance learning centre, and the campus’ academic skills centre.

History
The library began as the Erindale College Library began when the University of Toronto’s Erindale College was created in 1967. Initially, it was a small, mainly undergraduate library located in the campus’ North Building. In 1972, it moved to a  facility in the South Building (renamed the William G. Davis Building in 2009-10), becoming a full service campus library. Early in 2000, the Erindale College Library was renamed the University of Toronto Mississauga Library. In 2004, construction began on a new , $34-million library building project—the Hazel McCallion Academic Learning Centre. The new facility increased study space by 85 per cent, and better accommodated the campus’ growing student population than its predecessor, which was built for a student population half the size. The Hazel McCallion Academic Learning Centre opened for student use in October 2006.

Collections
The library has  a collection of print, electronic and networked resources in a wired and wireless environment. Its permanent collection comprises more than 400,000 volumes.

Facility
Designed by Shore Tilbe Irwin & Partners (now Perkins + Will Toronto), the library facility represents a ‘new breed’ of libraries referred to as ‘Academic Learning Centres' focused more on learning or ‘people’ space over space for collections and interested in engaging users in its teaching and learning mission.  The Hazel McCallion Academic Learning Centre features high density mobile compact shelving that houses the library’s permanent collection as well as generous perimeter space for quiet study and collaborative learning, all with views to the surrounding campus and natural landscape.  The building was the first at the University of Toronto to receive a silver LEEDs rating (Leadership in Energy and Environmental Design).

The design was inspired by the metaphor of a Japanese puzzle box.

The library is divided into Learning Zones: Quiet Conversation Zones where students are encouraged to work together on their academic projects, Silent Study Zones to provide environments for deep thinking and reflection, as well as Conversation- and Cell Phone-Friendly Zones in busier areas. Zones are marked with signs as well as glass installations, acoustic panels and appropriate furniture.

Specialized learning spaces

The Hazel McCallion Academic Learning Centre features specialized learning spaces, including:

 Adaptive Technology Centre – A space with specialized assistive software, equipment and services.
 Amgen Canada Inc. Smart Classrooms – Teaching spaces where students learn research, information, technological and spatial literacy skills. This space also functions as an extension of the Learning Commons, providing access to electronic resources and application software.
 AstraZeneca Canada Centre for Information and Technological Literacy – A space that provides support in the areas of instructional technology, geographic information systems, video, statistical software and data.
 Avie Bennett Community Novelties Reading Area – A space for leisure reading.
 Li Koon Chun Finance Learning Centre – Contains 32 dual-screen workstations, Bloomberg Terminals, Reuters 3000 Xtra and other research and analysis tools, as well as a stock market ticker board displaying live data feeds from the global financial community.
 RBC Learning Commons – Public computing area with desktop computers (PCs and MACs) and Netbooks and laptops for loan, a Print and Copy Centre, Information and Loans services, Research and Reference support and a Reserves section. A team of student assistants provide technical, service and referral support in the RBC Learning Commons.
 Robert Gillespie Academic Skills Centre.

References

University of Toronto libraries
Library buildings completed in 2001
Libraries established in 1967
1967 establishments in Canada